Leonard Clarence Strong (August 12, 1908 –  January 23, 1980) was an American character actor specializing in playing Asian roles.

Biography
Strong was born in Salt Lake City, Utah. Beginning with Little Tokyo, U.S.A in 1942, he played a gamut of roles as Japanese, Chinese, Koreans, Thais, etc. in films such as Dragon Seed (1944), Up in Arms (1944), Jack London (1943), Salute to the Marines (1943), Behind the Rising Sun (1943), Night Plane from Chungking (1943), Bombardier (1943), Underground Agent (1942),  and Manila Calling (1942). He played the Thai interpreter in both Anna and the King of Siam and its musical remake The King and I. He played Clem in The Lone Ranger episode (1/16) "Cannonball McKay" (1949). Strong also appeared in the movie Shane (1953) as homesteader Ernie Wright.

Strong achieved some pop culture notoriety for his role on television as "The Claw" on Get Smart, where Agent Maxwell Smart (Don Adams) is unable to understand Strong as he announces his evil nickname of “The Claw”; confused, Smart calls the villain “The Craw”, causing Strong to continuously correct him.

He appeared in a season-five episode of Alfred Hitchcock Presents (1960) "The Cure" written by horror writer Robert Bloch. Set deep in an Amazon jungle, Strong plays Luiz, a loyal native who speaks broken English and saves his employer, an oil explorer, from the attempted murder of his supposedly mentally ill and unfaithful wife. Something gets lost in the translation when his employer wants Strong to take her to a psychiatrist 200 miles down river, and he takes her instead to a native headshrinker. The denouement comes when Strong returns alone to the shock of his employer. He says, "I do what you tell me. I take her to my people. The best headshrinkers in the world". Then, pulling his employer's wife's now shrunken head out of a bag, he says, "Best job in the world."

Another notable television role was his haunting and mostly silent portrayal of the title character in the original Twilight Zone episode, "The Hitch-Hiker", which is often listed as one of the ten best episodes of the series. With his thumb extended, seeking a ride, and stating "I believe you're going...my way," Strong is seen in one of the half-dozen, seconds-long scenes used at the start of every one of the 30 DVDs in the CBS DVD five-season collection, "The Twilight Zone, The Definitive Edition." He died in Glendale, California.

Selected filmography

References

External links

Latter Day Saints in film website

Male actors from Utah
American male television actors
American male film actors
1908 births
1980 deaths
20th-century American male actors